() is the Islamic law concept of guaranteeing the security of a person (who is then called ) or a group of people for a limited time.

Evolution
The concept has pre-Islamic origins, being traced to the practice of  among the Arab tribes, which extended a tribe's protection over an—often outlawed—member of a different tribe. Muhammad extended tribal solidarity and protection to cover the entirety of the Muslim community, so the promise of safety could be extended by Muslims to non-Muslims, and formed the basis of the covenants of security issued to cities or peoples who submitted to the nascent Muslim caliphate, and which rendered these groups protected under Islamic law. 

In later times, the  became specifically restricted to the concept of safe-passage for a limited time (up to one lunar year) issued to enemies during their stay in Islamic territory, and had the right, within that period of time, to depart, unmolested by the Muslims, to a 'place of safety'. In the eyes of Islamic civil law, a passing  was considered the same as the s living under Islamic rule for the duration of his presence in Islamic lands, but differing traditions exist on whether this applied to criminal law as well. Foreign envoys enjoyed automatic  status, but not merchants or shipwrecked people.

offered to Muslims
 could also be issued to Muslims, such as defeated rebels. This was a widespread practice during the early Islamic period even though, as Joseph Schacht observes, "they are, strictly speaking, superfluous or even incompatible with religious law".

See also
Diplomatic immunity
Futuwwa, concept of moral behavior similar to Western chivalry in the medieval Arab and Muslim world
Hudna, truce or armistice in Islam
Istijarah, Islamic term for asylum
List of Islamic terms in Arabic
Sulh, Arabic word meaning "resolution" or "fixing" in general, frequently used in the context of social problems
Tahdia, Arabic for "calming" or "quieting"; stands for calming down hostilities without completely stopping them

References

Sources
 

Islamic jurisprudence
Legal immunity
Law of war
Arabic words and phrases in Sharia
Islam and other religions
Islamic terminology